Hugh Laughlin House is a historic home located at Redstone Township, Fayette County, Pennsylvania. It consists of two sections.  The older was built between about 1785 and 1795, and is a two-story, three bay, stone structure in the Georgian style. It measures 26 feet by 30 feet. A -story sandstone section was added between about 1800 and 1810.  It measures 22 feet by 20 feet.  Also on the property are the ruins of a large brick spring house.

It was added to the National Register of Historic Places in 1987.

References

Houses on the National Register of Historic Places in Pennsylvania
Georgian architecture in Pennsylvania
Houses completed in 1810
Houses in Fayette County, Pennsylvania
National Register of Historic Places in Fayette County, Pennsylvania